PS-51 Umerkot-I is a constituency of the Provincial Assembly of Sindh.

General elections 2013

General elections 2008

See also
 PS-50 Mirpur Khas-IV
 PS-52 Umerkot-II

References

External links
 Election commission Pakistan's official website
 Awazoday.com check result
 Official Website of Government of Sindh

Constituencies of Sindh